Szczytna  is a town in Kłodzko County, Lower Silesian Voivodeship, in south-western Poland. It is the seat of the administrative district (gmina) called Gmina Szczytna, close to the Czech border.

As at 2019, the town has a population of 5,141.

Two of the skirmishes of the War of the Bavarian Succession (1778–1779) occurred at the hamlet of Biebersdorf. In the first, on 7 August, Major Friedrich Joseph, Count of Nauendorf and two squadrons of the Wurmser Hussars, surprised a Prussian convoy, which surrendered 240 wagons of flour and 13 transport wagons. Nauendorf's Hussars also took as prisoners all the officers and 110 men, and captured 476 horses. While the parties negotiated at their differences at Teschen, on 3 March 1779, Nauendorf raided Biebersdorf again with a larger force of infantry and hussars and captured the entire Prussian garrison. Following this action, Joseph awarded him the Knight's Cross of the Military Order of Maria Theresa (19 May 1779).

References

Cities and towns in Lower Silesian Voivodeship
Kłodzko County